The Black River is a river in the Regional Municipality of York and the Regional Municipality of Durham in Central Ontario, Canada. It is part of the Great Lakes Basin, and is a tributary of Lake Simcoe; the entire watershed is under the auspices of the Lake Simcoe Region Conservation Authority.

Watershed

Course
The river begins at an unnamed lake on the Oak Ridges Moraine in Whitchurch–Stouffville, York Region, near the community of Cedar Valley. It heads northwest, under the Canadian National Railway main line, and then north into East Gwillimbury, then flows northeast under Ontario Highway 48 to cross the northwestern corner of Uxbridge, Durham Region. It flows under the former Lake Simcoe Railway branch of the Toronto and Nipissing Railway,  before returning to Georgina in York Region. It heads north, passes over the Baldwin Dam at the community of Baldwin, flows through the community of Sutton, and reaches its mouth at Lake Simcoe between the communities of Briars Park to the west and Mossington Park to the east. Lake Simcoe flows via Lake Couchiching and the Severn River to Lake Huron.

Recreation
Baldwin Conservation Area is a  conservation area on a small reservoir formed by the Baldwin Dam. The Sutton-Zephyr rail trail occupies a portion of the abandoned Lake Simcoe Railway branch of the Toronto and Nipissing Railway that crosses the Black River.

Tributaries
Zephyr Creek (right)
Mount Albert Creek (right)
Harrison Creek (left)

See also
List of rivers of Ontario

References

Other map sources:

Rivers of the Regional Municipality of York
Rivers of the Regional Municipality of Durham
Tributaries of Lake Simcoe